The Concerto for Piano and Wind Instruments was written by Igor Stravinsky in Paris in 1923–24. This work was revised in 1950.

It was composed four years after the Symphonies of Wind Instruments, which he wrote upon his arrival in Paris after his stay in Switzerland. These two compositions are from Stravinsky's neoclassical period, and represent a departure from the composer's previous Russian style, in which he produced works such as The Rite of Spring.

This concerto numbers among many works for piano written about the same time to be played by the composer himself. This is also true of Capriccio for Piano and Orchestra (1929), his Sonata of 1924 and his Serenade in A (1925). He kept the performance rights to himself for a number of years, wanting the engagements for playing this work for himself, as well as urgently desiring to keep "incompetent or Romantic hands" from "interpreting" the piece before undiscriminating audiences.

Orchestration
The concerto, as described in its name, is scored for solo piano accompanied by an ensemble of wind instruments. The instrumentation of the wind section is what would be found in a standard symphony orchestra: two flutes, piccolo, two oboes, cor anglais, two clarinets, two bassoons (second bassoon doubling contrabassoon), four horns, four trumpets, three trombones, and tuba. The work also calls for double basses (divisi in 3) and a timpano. Although combining winds and piano was unusual at the time, the form had been explored earlier in the twentieth century and would be explored later.

Première
The concerto debuted under Serge Koussevitzky at the Opera of Paris on 22 May 1924 under the direction of the composer, who played the piano. Koussevitzky had requested such a work of Stravinsky.

Stravinsky made his British radio debut in the British premiere of the work, on 19 June 1927, with the Wireless Symphony Orchestra (the fore-runner of the BBC Symphony Orchestra) conducted by his friend and champion Edward Clark.

Sources
Boosey.com

References

External links
Live performance streaming file performed by Dr. Willis G. Miller III.

Further reading 
 

Concertos by Igor Stravinsky
Neoclassicism (music)
1924 compositions
1950 compositions